Keswick School is a coeducational 11–18 academy in Cumbria, UK with 1360 pupils on roll. There are 309 students in the sixth form and 40 boarders. 

The school is the successor of the former free grammar school of Keswick, founded at the latest by 1591.

Two pupils of the school were killed on 24 May 2010 when a coach returning from a school trip was involved in a traffic collision on the A66 road.

References

External links 
 School Profile
 School Website

Boarding schools in Cumbria

Secondary schools in Cumbria
Academies in Cumbria
Keswick, Cumbria